Moussa Dembélé or Mousa Dembélé may refer to:

 Moussa Dembélé (hurdler) (born 1988), Senegalese athlete
 Moussa Dembélé (French footballer) (born 1996), striker who plays for Lyon
 Mousa Dembélé (Belgian footballer) (born 1987), midfielder who plays for Guangzhou R&F